

Africa

President – Abdelaziz Bouteflika, President of Algeria (1999–2019)
Prime Minister – Abdelmalek Sellal, Prime Minister of Algeria (2014–2017)

President – José Eduardo dos Santos, President of Angola (1979–2017)

President – Thomas Boni Yayi, President of Benin (2006–2016)
Prime Minister – Lionel Zinsou, Prime Minister of Benin (2015–2016)

President – Ian Khama, President of Botswana (2008–2018)

President –
Michel Kafando, Acting President of Burkina Faso (2014–2015)
Gilbert Diendéré, Head of National Council of Democracy of Burkina Faso (2015)
Michel Kafando, Acting President of Burkina Faso (2015)
Roch Marc Christian Kaboré, President of Burkina Faso (2015–2022)
Prime Minister –
Yacouba Isaac Zida, Acting Prime Minister of Burkina Faso (2014–2015)
Yacouba Isaac Zida, Acting Prime Minister of Burkina Faso (2015)

President – Pierre Nkurunziza, President of Burundi (2005–2020)

President – Paul Biya, President of Cameroon (1982–present)
Prime Minister – Philémon Yang, Prime Minister of Cameroon (2009–2019)

President – Jorge Carlos Fonseca, President of Cape Verde (2011–2021)
Prime Minister – José Maria Neves, Prime Minister of Cape Verde (2001–2016)

Head of State – Catherine Samba-Panza, Head of State of the Transition of the Central African Republic (2014–2016)
Prime Minister – Mahamat Kamoun, Prime Minister of the Central African Republic (2014–2016)

President – Idriss Déby, President of Chad (1990–2021)
Prime Minister – Kalzeubet Pahimi Deubet, Prime Minister of Chad (2013–2016)

President – Ikililou Dhoinine, President of the Comoros (2011–2016)

President – Denis Sassou Nguesso, President of the Republic of the Congo (1997–present)

President – Joseph Kabila, President of the Democratic Republic of the Congo (2001–2019)
Prime Minister – Augustin Matata Ponyo, Prime Minister of the Democratic Republic of the Congo (2012–2016)

President – Ismaïl Omar Guelleh, President of Djibouti (1999–present)
Prime Minister – Abdoulkader Kamil Mohamed, Prime Minister of Djibouti (2013–present)

President – Abdel Fattah el-Sisi, President of Egypt (2014–present)
Prime Minister –
Ibrahim Mahlab, Prime Minister of Egypt (2014–2015)
Sherif Ismail, Prime Minister of Egypt (2015–2018)

President – Teodoro Obiang Nguema Mbasogo, President of Equatorial Guinea (1979–present)
Prime Minister – Vicente Ehate Tomi, Prime Minister of Equatorial Guinea (2012–2016)

President – Isaias Afwerki, President of Eritrea (1991–present)

President – Mulatu Teshome, President of Ethiopia (2013–2018)
Prime Minister – Hailemariam Desalegn, Prime Minister of Ethiopia (2012–2018)

President – Ali Bongo Ondimba, President of Gabon (2009–present)
Prime Minister – Daniel Ona Ondo, Prime Minister of Gabon (2014–2016)

President – Yahya Jammeh, President of the Gambia (1994–2017)

President – John Dramani Mahama, President of Ghana (2012-2017)

President – Alpha Condé, President of Guinea (2010–2021)
Prime Minister –
Mohamed Said Fofana, Prime Minister of Guinea (2010–2015)
Mamady Youla, Prime Minister of Guinea (2015–2018)

President – José Mário Vaz, President of Guinea-Bissau (2014–2019)
Prime Minister –
Domingos Simões Pereira, Prime Minister of Guinea-Bissau (2014–2015)
Baciro Djá, Prime Minister of Guinea-Bissau (2015)
Carlos Correia, Prime Minister of Guinea-Bissau (2015–2016)

President – Alassane Ouattara, President of the Ivory Coast (2010–present)
Prime Minister – Daniel Kablan Duncan, Prime Minister of the Ivory Coast (2012–2017)

President – Uhuru Kenyatta, President of Kenya (2013–present)

Monarch – Letsie III, King of Lesotho (1996–present)
Prime Minister –
Tom Thabane, Prime Minister of Lesotho (2012–2015)
Pakalitha Mosisili, Prime Minister of Lesotho (2015–2017)

President – Ellen Johnson Sirleaf, President of Liberia (2006–2018)

Head of State –
Nouri Abusahmain, Chairman of the General National Congress of Libya (co-claimant, 2014–2016)
Aguila Saleh Issa, President of the House of Representatives of Libya (co-claimant, 2014–2021)
Prime Minister –
Abdullah al-Thani, Acting Prime Minister of Libya (co-claimant, 2014–2021)
Omar al-Hassi, Prime Minister of Libya (co-claimant, 2014–2015)
Khalifa al-Ghawi, Prime Minister of Libya (co-claimant, 2015–2016)

President – Hery Rajaonarimampianina, President of Madagascar (2014–2018)
Prime Minister –
Roger Kolo, Prime Minister of Madagascar (2014–2015)
Jean Ravelonarivo, Prime Minister of Madagascar (2015–2016)

President – Peter Mutharika, President of Malawi (2014–present)

President – Ibrahim Boubacar Keïta, President of Mali (2013–2020)
Prime Minister –
Moussa Mara, Prime Minister of Mali (2014–2015)
Modibo Keita, Prime Minister of Mali (2015–2017)

President – Mohamed Ould Abdel Aziz, President of Mauritania (2009–2019)
Prime Minister – Yahya Ould Hademine, Prime Minister of Mauritania (2014–2018)

President –
Kailash Purryag, President of Mauritius (2012–2015)
Monique Ohsan Bellepeau, Acting President of Mauritius (2015)
Ameenah Gurib, President of Mauritius (2015–2018)
Prime Minister – Sir Anerood Jugnauth, Prime Minister of Mauritius (2014–2017)

Monarch – Mohammed VI, King of Morocco (1999–present)
Prime Minister – Abdelilah Benkirane, Head of Government of Morocco (2011–2017)
 (self-declared, partially recognised state)
President – Mohamed Abdelaziz, President of Western Sahara (1976–2016)
Prime Minister – Abdelkader Taleb Omar, Prime Minister of Western Sahara (2003–2018)

President –
Armando Guebuza, President of Mozambique (2005–2015)
Filipe Nyusi, President of Mozambique (2015–present)
Prime Minister –
Alberto Vaquina, Prime Minister of Mozambique (2012–2015)
Carlos Agostinho do Rosário, Prime Minister of Mozambique (2015–2022)

President –
Hifikepunye Pohamba, President of Namibia (2005–2015)
Hage Geingob, President of Namibia (2015–present)
Prime Minister –
Hage Geingob, Prime Minister of Namibia (2012–2015)
Saara Kuugongelwa, Prime Minister of Namibia (2015–present)

President – Mahamadou Issoufou, President of Niger (2011–2021)
Prime Minister – Brigi Rafini, Prime Minister of Niger (2011–2021)

President –
Goodluck Jonathan, President of Nigeria (2010–2015)
Muhammadu Buhari, President of Nigeria (2015–present)

President – Paul Kagame, President of Rwanda (2000–present)
Prime Minister – Anastase Murekezi, Prime Minister of Rwanda (2014–2017)
 (Overseas Territory of the United Kingdom)
Governor – Mark Andrew Capes, Governor of Saint Helena (2011–2016)

President – Manuel Pinto da Costa, President of São Tomé and Príncipe (2011–2016)
Prime Minister – Patrice Trovoada, Prime Minister of São Tomé and Príncipe (2014–2018)

President – Macky Sall, President of Senegal (2012–present)
Prime Minister – Mohammed Dionne, Prime Minister of Senegal (2014–2019)

President – James Michel, President of Seychelles (2004–2016)

President – Ernest Bai Koroma, President of Sierra Leone (2007–2018)

President – Hassan Sheikh Mohamud, President of Somalia (2012–2017)
Prime Minister – Omar Abdirashid Ali Sharmarke, Prime Minister of Somalia (2014–2017)
 (unrecognised, secessionist state)
President – Ahmed Mohamed Mohamoud, President of Somaliland (2010–2017)
 (self-declared autonomous state)
President – Abdiweli Mohamed Ali, President of Puntland (2014–2019)

President – Jacob Zuma, President of South Africa (2009–2018)

President – Salva Kiir Mayardit, President of South Sudan (2005–present)

President – Omar al-Bashir, President of Sudan (1989–2019)

Monarch – Mswati III, King of Swaziland (1986–present)
Prime Minister – Barnabas Sibusiso Dlamini, Prime Minister of Swaziland (2008–2018)

President –
Jakaya Kikwete, President of Tanzania (2005–2015)
John Magufuli, President of Tanzania (2015–2021)
Prime Minister –
Mizengo Pinda, Prime Minister of Tanzania (2008–2015)
Kassim Majaliwa, Prime Minister of Tanzania (2015–present)

President – Faure Gnassingbé, President of Togo (2005–present)
Prime Minister –
Kwesi Ahoomey-Zunu, Prime Minister of Togo (2012–2015)
Komi Sélom Klassou, Prime Minister of Togo (2015–2020)

President – Beji Caid Essebsi, President of Tunisia (2014–2019)
Prime Minister –
Mehdi Jomaa, Head of Government of Tunisia (2014–2015)
Habib Essid, Head of Government of Tunisia (2015–2016)

President – Yoweri Museveni, President of Uganda (1986–present)
Prime Minister – Ruhakana Rugunda, Prime Minister of Uganda (2014–2021)

President –
Guy Scott, Acting President of Zambia (2014–2015)
Edgar Lungu, President of Zambia (2015–2021)

President – Robert Mugabe, President of Zimbabwe (1987– 2017)

Asia

President – Ashraf Ghani, President of Afghanistan (2014–2021)
Prime Minister – Abdullah Abdullah, Chief Executive Officer of Afghanistan (2014–2020)

Monarch – Sheikh Hamad bin Isa Al Khalifa, King of Bahrain (1999–present)
Prime Minister – Prince Khalifa bin Salman Al Khalifa, Prime Minister of Bahrain (1970–2020

President – Abdul Hamid, President of Bangladesh (2013–present)
Prime Minister – Sheikh Hasina, Prime Minister of Bangladesh (2009–present)

Monarch – Jigme Khesar Namgyel Wangchuck, King of Bhutan (2006–present)
Prime Minister – Tshering Tobgay, Prime Minister of Bhutan (2013–2018)

Monarch – Hassanal Bolkiah, Sultan of Brunei (1967–present)
Prime Minister – Hassanal Bolkiah, Prime Minister of Brunei (1984–present)

Monarch – Norodom Sihamoni, King of Cambodia (2004–present)
Prime Minister – Hun Sen, Prime Minister of Cambodia (1985–present)

Communist Party Leader – Xi Jinping, General Secretary of the Chinese Communist Party (2012–present)
President – Xi Jinping, President of China (2013–present)
Premier – Li Keqiang, Premier of the State Council of China (2013–present)

President – Taur Matan Ruak, President of East Timor (2012–2017)
Prime Minister –
Xanana Gusmão, Prime Minister of East Timor (2007–2015)
Rui Maria de Araújo, Prime Minister of East Timor (2015–2017)

President – Pranab Mukherjee, President of India (2012–2017)
Prime Minister – Narendra Modi, Prime Minister of India (2014–present)

President – Joko Widodo, President of Indonesia (2014–present)

Supreme Leader – Ayatollah Ali Khamenei, Supreme Leader of Iran (1989–present)
President – Hassan Rouhani, President of Iran (2013–2021)

President – Fuad Masum, President of Iraq (2014–2018)
Prime Minister – Haider al-Abadi, Prime Minister of Iraq (2014–2018)

President – Reuven Rivlin, President of Israel (2014–2021)
Prime Minister – Benjamin Netanyahu, Prime Minister of Israel (2009–2021)

Monarch – Akihito, Emperor of Japan (1989–2019)
Prime Minister – Shinzō Abe, Prime Minister of Japan (2012–2020)

Monarch – Abdullah II, King of Jordan (1999–present)
Prime Minister – Abdullah Ensour, Prime Minister of Jordan (2012–2016)

President – Nursultan Nazarbayev, President of Kazakhstan (1990–2019)
Prime Minister – Karim Massimov, Prime Minister of Kazakhstan (2014–2016)

Communist Party Leader – Kim Jong-un, First Secretary of the Workers' Party of Korea (2012–present)
De facto Head of State – Kim Jong-un, First Chairman of the National Defence Commission of North Korea (2011–present)
De jure Head of State – Kim Yong-nam, Chairman of the Presidium of the Supreme People's Assembly of North Korea (1998–2019)
Premier – Pak Pong-ju, Premier of the Cabinet of North Korea (2013–2019)

President – Park Geun-hye, President of South Korea (2013–2017)
Prime Minister –
Chung Hong-won, Prime Minister of South Korea (2013–2015)
Lee Wan-koo, Prime Minister of South Korea (2015)
Choi Kyoung-hwan, Acting Prime Minister of South Korea (2015)
Hwang Kyo-ahn, Prime Minister of South Korea (2015–2017)

Monarch – Sheikh Sabah Al-Ahmad Al-Jaber Al-Sabah, Emir of Kuwait (2006–2020)
Prime Minister – Sheikh Jaber Al-Mubarak Al-Hamad Al-Sabah, Prime Minister of Kuwait (2011–2019)

President – Almazbek Atambayev, President of Kyrgyzstan (2011–2017)
Prime Minister –
Djoomart Otorbaev, Prime Minister of Kyrgyzstan (2014–2015)
Temir Sariyev, Prime Minister of Kyrgyzstan (2015–2016)

Communist Party Leader – Choummaly Sayasone, General Secretary of the Lao People's Revolutionary Party (2006–2016)
President – Choummaly Sayasone, President of Laos (2006–2016)
Prime Minister – Thongsing Thammavong, Chairman of the Council of Ministers of Laos (2010–2016)

President – Tammam Salam, Acting President of Lebanon (2014–2016)
Prime Minister – Tammam Salam, President of the Council of Ministers of Lebanon (2014–2016)

Monarch – Tuanku Abdul Halim, Yang di-Pertuan Agong of Malaysia (2011–2016)
Prime Minister – Najib Razak, Prime Minister of Malaysia (2009–2018)

President – Abdulla Yameen, President of the Maldives (2013–2018)

President – Tsakhiagiin Elbegdorj, President of Mongolia (2009–2017)
Prime Minister – Chimediin Saikhanbileg, Prime Minister of Mongolia (2014–2016)

President – Thein Sein, President of Myanmar (2011–2016)

President –
Ram Baran Yadav, President of Nepal (2008–2015)
Bidhya Devi Bhandari, President of Nepal (2015–present)
Prime Minister –
Sushil Koirala, Prime Minister of Nepal (2014–2015)
Khadga Prasad Oli, Prime Minister of Nepal (2015–2016)

Monarch – Qaboos bin Said al Said, Sultan of Oman (1970–2020)
Prime Minister – Qaboos bin Said al Said, Prime Minister of Oman (1972–2020)

President – Mamnoon Hussain, President of Pakistan (2013–2018)
Prime Minister – Nawaz Sharif, Prime Minister of Pakistan (2013–2017)

President – Mahmoud Abbas, President of Palestine (2005–present)
Prime Minister – Rami Hamdallah, Prime Minister of Palestine (2013–2019)

President – Benigno Aquino, President of the Philippines (2010–2016)

Monarch – Sheikh Tamim bin Hamad Al Thani, Emir of Qatar (2013–present)
Prime Minister – Sheikh Abdullah bin Nasser bin Khalifa Al Thani, Prime Minister of Qatar (2013–2020)

Monarch –
Abdullah, King of Saudi Arabia (2005–2015)
Salman, King of Saudi Arabia (2015–present)
Prime Minister –
Abdullah, Prime Minister of Saudi Arabia (2005–2015)
Salman, Prime Minister of Saudi Arabia (2015–present)

President – Tony Tan, President of Singapore (2011–2017)
Prime Minister – Lee Hsien Loong, Prime Minister of Singapore (2004–present)

President –
Mahinda Rajapaksa, President of Sri Lanka (2005–2015)
Maithripala Sirisena, President of Sri Lanka (2015–2019)
Prime Minister –
D. M. Jayaratne, Prime Minister of Sri Lanka (2010–2015)
Ranil Wickremesinghe, Prime Minister of Sri Lanka (2015–2018)
Syria

President – Bashar al-Assad, President of Syria (2000–present)
Prime Minister – Wael Nader al-Halqi, Prime Minister of Syria (2012–2016)
 (partially recognised, rival government)
President –
Hadi al-Bahra, President of the Syrian National Coalition (2014–2015)
Khaled Khoja, President of the Syrian National Coalition (2015–2016)
Prime Minister – Ahmad Tu'mah, Prime Minister of the Syrian National Coalition (2014–2016)

President – Ma Ying-jeou, President of Taiwan (2008–2016)
Premier – Mao Chi-kuo, President of the Executive Yuan of Taiwan (2014–2016)

President – Emomali Rahmon, President of Tajikistan (1992–present)
Prime Minister – Kokhir Rasulzoda, Prime Minister of Tajikistan (2013–present)

Monarch – Bhumibol Adulyadej, King of Thailand (1946–2016)
Prime Minister – Prayut Chan-o-cha, Prime Minister of Thailand (2014–present)

President – Recep Tayyip Erdoğan, President of Turkey (2014–present)
Prime Minister – Ahmet Davutoğlu, Prime Minister of Turkey (2014–2016)

President – Gurbanguly Berdimuhamedow, President of Turkmenistan (2006–2022)

President – Sheikh Khalifa bin Zayed Al Nahyan, President of the United Arab Emirates (2004–present)
Prime Minister – Sheikh Mohammed bin Rashid Al Maktoum, Prime Minister of the United Arab Emirates (2006–present)

President – Islam Karimov, President of Uzbekistan (1990–2016)
Prime Minister – Shavkat Mirziyoyev, Prime Minister of Uzbekistan (2003–2016)

Communist Party Leader – Nguyễn Phú Trọng, General Secretary of the Communist Party of Vietnam (2011–present)
President – Trương Tấn Sang, President of Vietnam (2011–2016)
Prime Minister – Nguyễn Tấn Dũng, Prime Minister of Vietnam (2006–2016)
Yemen

President – Abdrabbuh Mansur Hadi, President of Yemen (2012–present)
Prime Minister – Khaled Bahah, Prime Minister of Yemen (2014–2016)
  Supreme Revolutionary Committee of Yemen (unrecognised, rival government)
the Yemeni Supreme Revolutionary Committee was formed on 6 February
Head of State – Mohammed Ali al-Houthi, President of the Supreme Revolutionary Committee of Yemen (2015–2016)

Europe

President – Bujar Nishani, President of Albania (2012–2017)
Prime Minister – Edi Rama, Prime Minister of Albania (2013–present)

Monarchs –
French Co-Prince – François Hollande, French Co-prince of Andorra (2012–2017)
Co-Prince's Representative –
Sylvie Hubac (2012–2015)
Thierry Lataste (2015–2016)
Episcopal Co-Prince – Archbishop Joan Enric Vives Sicília, Episcopal Co-prince of Andorra (2003–present)
Co-Prince's Representative – Josep Maria Mauri (2012–present)
Prime Minister –
Antoni Martí, Head of Government of Andorra (2011–2015)
Gilbert Saboya Sunyé, Acting Head of Government of Andorra (2015)
Antoni Martí, Head of Government of Andorra (2015–2019)

President – Serzh Sargsyan, President of Armenia (2008–2018)
Prime Minister – Hovik Abrahamyan, Prime Minister of Armenia (2014–2016)

President – Heinz Fischer, Federal President of Austria (2004–2016)
Chancellor – Werner Faymann, Federal Chancellor of Austria (2008–2016)

President – Ilham Aliyev, President of Azerbaijan (2003–present)
Prime Minister – Artur Rasizade, Prime Minister of Azerbaijan (2003–2018)
 (unrecognised, secessionist state)
President – Bako Sahakyan, President of Nagorno-Karabakh (2007–2020)
Prime Minister – Arayik Harutyunyan, Prime Minister of Nagorno-Karabakh (2007–2017)

President – Alexander Lukashenko, President of Belarus (1994–present)
Prime Minister – Andrei Kobyakov, Prime Minister of Belarus (2014–2018)

Monarch – Philippe, King of the Belgians (2013–present)
Prime Minister – Charles Michel, Prime Minister of Belgium (2014–2019)

Head of State – Presidency of Bosnia and Herzegovina
Serb Member – Mladen Ivanić (2014–2018; Chairman of the Presidency of Bosnia and Herzegovina, 2014–2015)
Croat Member – Dragan Čović (2014–2018; Chairman of the Presidency of Bosnia and Herzegovina, 2015–2016)
Bosniak Member – Bakir Izetbegović (2010–2018)
Prime Minister –
Vjekoslav Bevanda, Chairman of the Council of Ministers of Bosnia and Herzegovina (2012–2015)
Denis Zvizdić, Chairman of the Council of Ministers of Bosnia and Herzegovina (2015–2019)
High Representative – Valentin Inzko, High Representative for Bosnia and Herzegovina (2009–2021)

President – Rosen Plevneliev, President of Bulgaria (2012–2017)
Prime Minister – Boyko Borisov, Prime Minister of Bulgaria (2014–2017)

President –
Ivo Josipović, President of Croatia (2010–2015)
Kolinda Grabar-Kitarović, President of Croatia (2015–2020)
Prime Minister – Zoran Milanović, Prime Minister of Croatia (2011–2016)

President – Nicos Anastasiades, President of Cyprus (2013–present)
 (unrecognised, secessionist state)
President –
Derviş Eroğlu, President of Northern Cyprus (2010–2015)
Mustafa Akıncı, President of Northern Cyprus (2015–2020)
Prime Minister –
Özkan Yorgancıoğlu, Prime Minister of Northern Cyprus (2013–2015)
Ömer Kalyoncu, Prime Minister of Northern Cyprus (2015–2016)

President – Miloš Zeman, President of the Czech Republic (2013–present)
Prime Minister – Bohuslav Sobotka, Prime Minister of the Czech Republic (2014–2017)

Monarch – Margrethe II, Queen of Denmark (1972–present)
Prime Minister –
Helle Thorning-Schmidt, Prime Minister of Denmark (2011–2015)
Lars Løkke Rasmussen, Prime Minister of Denmark (2015–2019)

President – Toomas Hendrik Ilves, President of Estonia (2006–2016)
Prime Minister – Taavi Rõivas, Prime Minister of Estonia (2014–2016)

President – Sauli Niinistö, President of Finland (2012–present)
Prime Minister –
Alexander Stubb, Prime Minister of Finland (2014–2015)
Juha Sipilä, Prime Minister of Finland (2015–2019)

President – François Hollande, President of France (2012–2017)
Prime Minister – Manuel Valls, Prime Minister of France (2014–2016)

President – Giorgi Margvelashvili, President of Georgia (2013–2018)
Prime Minister –
Irakli Garibashvili, Prime Minister of Georgia (2013–2015)
Giorgi Kvirikashvili, Prime Minister of Georgia (2015–2018)
 (partially recognised, secessionist state)
President – Raul Khajimba, President of Abkhazia (2014–2020)
Prime Minister –
Beslan Butba, Prime Minister of Abkhazia (2014–2015)
Shamil Adzynba, Acting Prime Minister of Abkhazia (2015)
Artur Mikvabia, Prime Minister of Abkhazia (2015–2016)
 (partially recognised, secessionist state)
President – Leonid Tibilov, President of South Ossetia (2012–2017)
Prime Minister – Domenty Kulumbegov, Prime Minister of South Ossetia (2014–2017)

President – Joachim Gauck, Federal President of Germany (2012–2017)
Chancellor – Angela Merkel, Federal Chancellor of Germany (2005–2021)

President –
Karolos Papoulias, President of Greece (2005–2015)
Prokopis Pavlopoulos, President of Greece (2015–2020)
Prime Minister –
Antonis Samaras, Prime Minister of Greece (2012–2015)
Alexis Tsipras, Prime Minister of Greece (2015)
Vassiliki Thanou-Christophilou, Prime Minister of Greece (2015)
Alexis Tsipras, Prime Minister of Greece (2015–2019)

President – János Áder, President of Hungary (2012–present)
Prime Minister – Viktor Orbán, Prime Minister of Hungary (2010–present)

President – Ólafur Ragnar Grímsson, President of Iceland (1996–2016)
Prime Minister – Sigmundur Davíð Gunnlaugsson, Prime Minister of Iceland (2013–2016)

President – Michael D. Higgins, President of Ireland (2011–present)
Prime Minister – Enda Kenny, Taoiseach of Ireland (2011–2017)

President –
Giorgio Napolitano, President of Italy (2006–2015)
Pietro Grasso, Acting President of Italy (2015)
Sergio Mattarella, President of Italy (2015–present)
Prime Minister – Matteo Renzi, President of the Council of Ministers of Italy (2014–2016)

President –
Andris Bērziņš, President of Latvia (2011–2015)
Raimonds Vējonis, President of Latvia (2015–2019)
Prime Minister – Laimdota Straujuma, Prime Minister of Latvia (2014–2016)

Monarch – Hans-Adam II, Prince Regnant of Liechtenstein (1989–present)
Regent – Hereditary Prince Alois, Regent of Liechtenstein (2004–present)
Prime Minister – Adrian Hasler, Head of Government of Liechtenstein (2013–2021)

President – Dalia Grybauskaitė, President of Lithuania (2009–2019)
Prime Minister – Algirdas Butkevičius, Prime Minister of Lithuania (2012–2016)

Monarch – Henri, Grand Duke of Luxembourg (2000–present)
Prime Minister – Xavier Bettel, Prime Minister of Luxembourg (2013–present)

President – Gjorge Ivanov, President of Macedonia (2009–2019)
Prime Minister – Nikola Gruevski, President of the Government of Macedonia (2006–2016)

President – Marie Louise Coleiro Preca, President of Malta (2014–2019)
Prime Minister – Joseph Muscat, Prime Minister of Malta (2013–2020)

President – Nicolae Timofti, President of Moldova (2012–2016)
Prime Minister –
Iurie Leancă, Prime Minister of Moldova (2013–2015)
Chiril Gaburici, Prime Minister of Moldova (2015)
Natalia Gherman, Acting Prime Minister of Moldova (2015)
Valeriu Streleț, Prime Minister of Moldova (2015)
Gheorghe Brega, Acting Prime Minister of Moldova (2015–2016)
 (unrecognised, secessionist state)
President – Yevgeny Shevchuk, President of Transnistria (2011–2016)
Prime Minister –
Tatiana Turanskaya, Prime Minister of Transnistria (2013–2015)
Maya Parnas, Acting Prime Minister of Transnistria (2015)
Tatiana Turanskaya, Prime Minister of Transnistria (2015)
Maya Parnas, Acting Prime Minister of Transnistria (2015)
Pavel Prokudin, Prime Minister of Transnistria (2015–2016)

Monarch – Albert II, Sovereign Prince of Monaco (2005–present)
Prime Minister –
Michel Roger, Minister of State of Monaco (2010–2015)
Gilles Tonelli, Acting Minister of State of Monaco (2015–2016)

President – Filip Vujanović, President of Montenegro (2003–2018)
Prime Minister – Milo Đukanović, Prime Minister of Montenegro (2012–2016)

Monarch – Willem-Alexander, King of the Netherlands (2013–present)
 (constituent country)
Prime Minister – Mark Rutte, Prime Minister of the Netherlands (2010–present)
 (constituent country)
see 
 (constituent country)
see 
 (constituent country)
see 

Monarch – Harald V, King of Norway (1991–present)
Prime Minister – Erna Solberg, Prime Minister of Norway (2013–2021)

President –
Bronisław Komorowski, President of Poland (2010–2015)
Andrzej Duda, President of Poland (2015–present)
Prime Minister –
Ewa Kopacz, Chairman of the Council of Ministers of Poland (2014–2015)
Beata Szydło, Chairman of the Council of Ministers of Poland (2015–2017)

President – Aníbal Cavaco Silva, President of Portugal (2006–2016)
Prime Minister –
Pedro Passos Coelho, Prime Minister of Portugal (2011–2015)
António Costa, Prime Minister of Portugal (2015–present)

President – Klaus Iohannis, President of Romania (2014–present)
Prime Minister –
Victor Ponta, Prime Minister of Romania (2012–2015)
Gabriel Oprea, Acting Prime Minister of Romania (2015)
Sorin Cîmpeanu, Acting Prime Minister of Romania (2015)
Dacian Cioloș, Prime Minister of Romania (2015–2017)

President – Vladimir Putin, President of Russia (2012–present)
Prime Minister – Dmitry Medvedev, Chairman of the Government of Russia (2012–2020)

Captains-Regent –
Gianfranco Terenzi and Guerrino Zanotti, Captains Regent of San Marino (2014–2015)
Andrea Belluzzi and Roberto Venturini, Captains Regent of San Marino (2015)
Lorella Stefanelli and Nicola Renzi, Captains Regent of San Marino (2015–2016)

President – Tomislav Nikolić, President of Serbia (2012–2017)
Prime Minister – Aleksandar Vučić, Prime Minister of Serbia (2014–2017)
 (partially recognised, secessionist state; under nominal international administration)
President – Atifete Jahjaga, President of Kosovo (2011–2016)
Prime Minister – Isa Mustafa, Prime Minister of Kosovo (2014–2017)
UN Special Representative –
Farid Zarif, Special Representative of the UN Secretary-General for Kosovo (2011–2015)
Simona Miculescu, Acting Special Representative of the UN Secretary-General for Kosovo (2015)
Zahir Tanin, Special Representative of the UN Secretary-General for Kosovo (2015–present)

President – Andrej Kiska, President of Slovakia (2014–2019)
Prime Minister – Robert Fico, Prime Minister of Slovakia (2012–2018)

President – Borut Pahor, President of Slovenia (2012–present)
Prime Minister – Miro Cerar, Prime Minister of Slovenia (2014–2018)

Monarch – Felipe VI, King of Spain (2014–present)
Prime Minister – Mariano Rajoy, President of the Government of Spain (2011–2018)

Monarch – Carl XVI Gustaf, King of Sweden (1973–present)
Prime Minister – Stefan Löfven, Prime Minister of Sweden (2014–2021)

Council – Federal Council of Switzerland
Members – Doris Leuthard (2006–present), Eveline Widmer-Schlumpf (2008–2015), Ueli Maurer (2009–present), Didier Burkhalter (2009–present), Johann Schneider-Ammann (2010–present), Simonetta Sommaruga (2010–present; President of Switzerland, 2015), and Alain Berset (2012–present)

President – Petro Poroshenko, President of Ukraine (2014–2019)
Prime Minister – Arseniy Yatsenyuk, Prime Minister of Ukraine (2014–2016)
 Donetsk People's Republic (unrecognised, secessionist state)
President – Alexander Zakharchenko, President of Donetsk People's Republic (2014–2018)
Prime Minister – Alexander Zakharchenko, Prime Minister of Donetsk People's Republic (2014–2018)
 Luhansk People's Republic (unrecognised, secessionist state)
President – Igor Plotnitsky, Head of state of Luhansk People's Republic (2014–2017)
Prime Minister –
Hennadi Tsypkalov, Prime Minister of Luhansk People's Republic (2014=2015)
Sergey Kozlov, Prime Minister of Luhansk People's Republic (2015–present)

Monarch – Elizabeth II, Queen of the United Kingdom (1952–2022)
Prime Minister – David Cameron, Prime Minister of the United Kingdom (2010–2016)
 (Crown dependency of the United Kingdom)
Lieutenant-Governor – Adam Wood, Lieutenant Governor of the Isle of Man (2011–2016)
Chief Minister – Allan Bell, Chief Minister of the Isle of Man (2011–2016)
 (Crown dependency of the United Kingdom)
Lieutenant-Governor –
Peter Walker, Lieutenant Governor of Guernsey (2011–2015)
Sir Richard Collas, Acting Lieutenant Governor of Guernsey (2015–2016)
Chief Minister – Jonathan Le Tocq, Chief Minister of Guernsey (2014–2016)
 (Crown dependency of the United Kingdom)
Lieutenant-Governor – Sir John McColl, Lieutenant Governor of Jersey (2011-2016)
Chief Minister – Ian Gorst, Chief Minister of Jersey (2011–2018)
 (Overseas Territory of the United Kingdom)
Governor –
Sir James Dutton, Governor of Gibraltar (2013–2015)
Alison MacMillan, Acting Governor of Gibraltar (2015–2016)
Chief Minister – Fabian Picardo, Chief Minister of Gibraltar (2011–present)

Monarch – Pope Francis, Sovereign of Vatican City (2013–present)
Head of Government – Cardinal Giuseppe Bertello, President of the Governorate of Vatican City (2011–2021)
Holy See (sui generis subject of public international law)
Secretary of State – Cardinal Pietro Parolin, Cardinal Secretary of State (2013–present)

North America
 (Overseas Territory of the United Kingdom)
Governor – Christina Scott, Governor of Anguilla (2013–2017)
Chief Minister –
Hubert Hughes, Chief Minister of Anguilla (2010–2015)
Victor Banks, Chief Minister of Anguilla (2015–2019)

Monarch – Elizabeth II, Queen of Antigua and Barbuda (1981–present)
Governor-General – Sir Rodney Williams, Governor-General of Antigua and Barbuda (2014–present)
Prime Minister – Gaston Browne, Prime Minister of Antigua and Barbuda (2014–present)
 (constituent country of the Kingdom of the Netherlands)
Governor – Fredis Refunjol, Governor of Aruba (2004–2016)
Prime Minister – Mike Eman, Prime Minister of Aruba (2009–present)

Monarch – Elizabeth II, Queen of the Bahamas (1973–present)
Governor-General – Dame Marguerite Pindling, Governor-General of the Bahamas (2014–2019)
Prime Minister – Perry Christie, Prime Minister of the Bahamas (2012–2017)

Monarch – Elizabeth II, Queen of Barbados (1966–2021)
Governor-General – Sir Elliott Belgrave, Governor-General of Barbados (2012–2017)
Prime Minister – Freundel Stuart, Prime Minister of Barbados (2010–2018)

Monarch – Elizabeth II, Queen of Belize (1981–present)
Governor-General – Sir Colville Young, Governor-General of Belize (1993–2021)
Prime Minister – Dean Barrow, Prime Minister of Belize (2008–2020)
 (Overseas Territory of the United Kingdom)
Governor – George Fergusson, Governor of Bermuda (2012–2016)
Premier – Michael Dunkley, Premier of Bermuda (2014–2017)
 (Overseas Territory of the United Kingdom)
Governor – John Duncan, Governor of the British Virgin Islands (2014–2017)
Premier – Orlando Smith, Premier of the British Virgin Islands (2011–2019)

Monarch – Elizabeth II, Queen of Canada (1952–present)
Governor-General – David Johnston, Governor General of Canada (2010–2017)
Prime Minister –
Stephen Harper, Prime Minister of Canada (2006–2015)
Justin Trudeau, Prime Minister of Canada (2015–present)
 (Overseas Territory of the United Kingdom)
Governor – Helen Kilpatrick, Governor of the Cayman Islands (2013–2018)
Premier – Alden McLaughlin, Premier of the Cayman Islands (2013–present)

President – Luis Guillermo Solís, President of Costa Rica (2014–2018)

Communist Party Leader – Raúl Castro, First Secretary of the Communist Party of Cuba (2011–2021)
President – Raúl Castro, President of the Council of State of Cuba (2008–2018)
Prime Minister – Raúl Castro, President of the Council of Ministers of Cuba (2008–2018)
 (constituent country of the Kingdom of the Netherlands)
Governor – Lucille George-Wout, Governor of Curaçao (2013–present)
Prime Minister –
Ivar Asjes, Prime Minister of Curaçao (2013–2015)
Ben Whiteman, Prime Minister of Curaçao (2015–2016)

President – Charles Savarin, President of Dominica (2013–present)
Prime Minister – Roosevelt Skerrit, Prime Minister of Dominica (2004–present)

President – Danilo Medina, President of the Dominican Republic (2012–present)

President – Salvador Sánchez Cerén, President of El Salvador (2014–2019)

Monarch – Elizabeth II, Queen of Grenada (1974–present)
Governor-General – Dame Cécile La Grenade, Governor-General of Grenada (2013–present)
Prime Minister – Keith Mitchell, Prime Minister of Grenada (2013–2022)

President –
Otto Pérez Molina, President of Guatemala (2012–2015)
Alejandro Maldonado, Acting President of Guatemala (2015–2016)

President – Michel Martelly, President of Haiti (2011–2016)
Prime Minister –
Florence Duperval Guillaume, Acting Prime Minister of Haiti (2014–2015)
Evans Paul, Prime Minister of Haiti (2015–2016)

President – Juan Orlando Hernández, President of Honduras (2014–2022)

Monarch – Elizabeth II, Queen of Jamaica (1962–present)
Governor-General – Sir Patrick Allen, Governor-General of Jamaica (2009–present)
Prime Minister – Portia Simpson-Miller, Prime Minister of Jamaica (2012–2016)

President – Enrique Peña Nieto, President of Mexico (2012–2018)
 (Overseas Territory of the United Kingdom)
Governor –
Adrian Davis, Governor of Montserrat (2011–2015)
Alric Taylor, Acting Governor of Montserrat (2015)
Elizabeth Carriere, Governor of Montserrat (2015–2018)
Premier – Donaldson Romeo, Premier of Montserrat (2014–2019)

President – Daniel Ortega, President of Nicaragua (2007–present)

President – Juan Carlos Varela, President of Panama (2014–2019)
  (overseas collectivity of France)
Prefect –
Philippe Chopin, Prefect of Saint Barthélemy (2011–2015)
Anne Laubies, Prefect of Saint Barthélemy (2015–2018)
Head of Government – Bruno Magras, President of the Territorial Council of Saint Barthélemy (2007–present)

Monarch – Elizabeth II, Queen of Saint Kitts and Nevis (1983–present)
Governor-General –
Sir Edmund Lawrence, Governor-General of Saint Kitts and Nevis (2013–2015)
Sir Tapley Seaton, Governor-General of Saint Kitts and Nevis (2015–present)
Prime Minister –
Denzil Douglas, Prime Minister of Saint Kitts and Nevis (1995–2015)
Timothy Harris, Prime Minister of Saint Kitts and Nevis (2015–present)

Monarch – Elizabeth II, Queen of Saint Lucia (1979–present)
Governor-General – Dame Pearlette Louisy, Governor-General of Saint Lucia (1997–2017)
Prime Minister – Kenny Anthony, Prime Minister of Saint Lucia (2011–2016)
 (overseas collectivity of France)
Prefect –
Philippe Chopin, Prefect of Saint Martin (2011–2015)
Anne Laubies, Prefect of Saint Martin (2015–2018)
Head of Government – Aline Hanson, President of the Territorial Council of Saint Martin (2013–2017)
  (overseas collectivity of France)
Prefect – Jean-Christophe Bouvier, Prefect of Saint Pierre and Miquelon (2014–2016)
Head of Government – Stéphane Artano, President of the Territorial Council of Saint Pierre and Miquelon (2006–2018)

Monarch – Elizabeth II, Queen of Saint Vincent and the Grenadines (1979–present)
Governor-General – Sir Frederick Ballantyne, Governor-General of Saint Vincent and the Grenadines (2002–2019)
Prime Minister – Ralph Gonsalves, Prime Minister of Saint Vincent and the Grenadines (2001–present)
 (constituent country of the Kingdom of the Netherlands)
Governor – Eugene Holiday, Governor of Sint Maarten (2010–present)
Prime Minister –
Marcel Gumbs, Prime Minister of Sint Maarten (2014–2015)
William Marlin, Prime Minister of Sint Maarten (2015–2017)

President – Anthony Carmona, President of Trinidad and Tobago (2013–2018)
Prime Minister –
Kamla Persad-Bissessar, Prime Minister of Trinidad and Tobago (2010–2015)
Keith Rowley, Prime Minister of Trinidad and Tobago (2015–present)
 (Overseas Territory of the United Kingdom)
Governor – Peter Beckingham, Governor of the Turks and Caicos Islands (2013–2016)
Premier – Rufus Ewing, Premier of the Turks and Caicos Islands (2012–2016)

President – Barack Obama, President of the United States (2009–2017)
 (Commonwealth of the United States)
Governor – Alejandro García Padilla, Governor of Puerto Rico (2013–2017)
 (insular area of the United States)
Governor –
John de Jongh, Governor of the United States Virgin Islands (2007–2015)
Kenneth Mapp, Governor of the United States Virgin Islands (2015–2019)

Oceania
 (unorganised, unincorporated territory of the United States)
Governor – Lolo Matalasi Moliga, Governor of American Samoa (2013–2021)

Monarch – Elizabeth II, Queen of Australia (1952–present)
Governor-General – Sir Peter Cosgrove, Governor-General of Australia (2014–2019)
Prime Minister –
Tony Abbott, Prime Minister of Australia (2013–2015)
Malcolm Turnbull, Prime Minister of Australia (2015–2018)
 (external territory of Australia)
Administrator – Barry Haase, Administrator of Christmas Island (2014–2017)
Shire-President – Gordon Thomson, Shire president of Christmas Island (2013–present)
 (external territory of Australia)
Administrator – Barry Haase, Administrator of the Cocos (Keeling) Islands (2014–2017)
Shire-President –
Aindil Minkom, Shire president of the Cocos (Keeling) Islands (2011–2015)
Balmut Pirus, Shire president of the Cocos (Keeling) Islands (2015–2017)
 (self-governing territory of Australia)
Administrator – Gary Hardgrave, Administrator of Norfolk Island (2014–2017)
Chief Minister – Lisle Snell, Chief Minister of Norfolk Island (2013–2015)

President –
Ratu Epeli Nailatikau, President of Fiji (2009–2015)
Jioji Konrote, President of Fiji (2015–2021)
Prime Minister – Frank Bainimarama, Prime Minister of Fiji (2007–present)
  (overseas collectivity of France)
High Commissioner – Lionel Beffre, High Commissioner of the Republic in French Polynesia (2013–2016)
President – Édouard Fritch, President of French Polynesia (2014–2019)
 (insular area of the United States)
Governor – Eddie Baza Calvo, Governor of Guam (2011–2019)

President – Anote Tong, President of Kiribati (2003–2016)

President – Christopher Loeak, President of the Marshall Islands (2012–2016)

President –
Manny Mori, President of Micronesia (2007–2015)
Peter M. Christian, President of Micronesia (2015–2019)

President – Baron Waqa, President of Nauru (2013–2019)
  (sui generis collectivity of France)
High Commissioner – Vincent Bouvier, High Commissioner of New Caledonia (2014–2016)
Head of Government –
Cynthia Ligeard, President of the Government of New Caledonia (2014–2015)
Philippe Germain, President of the Government of New Caledonia (2015–2019)

Monarch – Elizabeth II, Queen of New Zealand (1952–present)
Governor-General – Sir Jerry Mateparae, Governor-General of New Zealand (2011–2016)
Prime Minister – John Key, Prime Minister of New Zealand (2008–2016)
 (associated state of New Zealand)
Queen's Representative – Tom Marsters, Queen's Representative of the Cook Islands (2013–present)
Prime Minister – Henry Puna, Prime Minister of the Cook Islands (2010–2020)
 (associated state of New Zealand)
Premier – Toke Talagi, Premier of Niue (2008–present)
 (dependent territory of New Zealand)
Administrator –
Jonathan Kings, Administrator of Tokelau (2011–2015)
Linda Te Puni, Acting Administrator of Tokelau (2015–present)
Head of Government –
Kuresa Nasau, Head of Government of Tokelau (2014–2015)
Siopili Perez, Head of Government of Tokelau (2015–2016)
 (Commonwealth of the United States)
Governor –
Eloy Inos, Governor of the Northern Mariana Islands (2013–2015)
Ralph Torres, Governor of the Northern Mariana Islands (2015–present)

President – Tommy Remengesau, President of Palau (2013–2021)

Monarch – Elizabeth II, Queen of Papua New Guinea (1975–present)
Governor-General – Sir Michael Ogio, Governor-General of Papua New Guinea (2011–2017)
Prime Minister – Peter O'Neill, Prime Minister of Papua New Guinea (2011–2019)
 (Overseas Territory of the United Kingdom)
Governor – Jonathan Sinclair, Governor of the Pitcairn Islands (2014–2017)
Mayor – Shawn Christian, Mayor of the Pitcairn Islands (2014–2019)

Head of State – Tufuga Efi, O le Ao o le Malo of Samoa (2007–2017)
Prime Minister – Tuilaepa Aiono Sailele Malielegaoi, Prime Minister of Samoa (1998–2021)

Monarch – Elizabeth II, Queen of the Solomon Islands (1978–present)
Governor-General – Sir Frank Kabui, Governor-General of the Solomon Islands (2009–2019)
Prime Minister – Manasseh Sogavare, Prime Minister of the Solomon Islands (2014–2017)

Monarch – Tupou VI, King of Tonga (2012–present)
Prime Minister – ʻAkilisi Pōhiva, Prime Minister of Tonga (2014–2019)

Monarch – Elizabeth II, Queen of Tuvalu (1978–present)
Governor-General – Sir Iakoba Italeli, Governor-General of Tuvalu (2010–2019)
Prime Minister – Enele Sopoaga, Prime Minister of Tuvalu (2013–2019)

President – Baldwin Lonsdale, President of Vanuatu (2014–2017)
Prime Minister –
Joe Natuman, Prime Minister of Vanuatu (2014–2015)
Sato Kilman, Prime Minister of Vanuatu (2015–2016)
  (overseas collectivity of France)
Administrator –
Michel Aubouin, Administrator Superior of Wallis and Futuna (2013–2015)
Marcel Renouf, Administrator Superior of Wallis and Futuna (2015–2017)
Head of Government – Mikaele Kulimoetoke, President of the Territorial Assembly of Wallis and Futuna (2014–2017)

South America

President –
Cristina Fernández de Kirchner, President of Argentina (2007–2015)
Federico Pinedo, Acting President of Argentina (2015)
Mauricio Macri, President of Argentina (2015–present)

President – Evo Morales, President of Bolivia (2006–2019)

President – Dilma Rousseff, President of Brazil (2011–2016)

President – Michelle Bachelet, President of Chile (2014–2018)

President – Juan Manuel Santos, President of Colombia (2010–2018)

President – Rafael Correa, President of Ecuador (2007–2017)
 (Overseas Territory of the United Kingdom)
Governor – Colin Roberts, Governor of the Falkland Islands (2014–2017)
Head of Government – Keith Padgett, Chief Executive of the Falkland Islands (2012–2016)

President –
Donald Ramotar, President of Guyana (2011–2015)
David A. Granger, President of Guyana (2015–2020)
Prime Minister –
Sam Hinds, Prime Minister of Guyana (1999–2015)
Moses Nagamootoo, Prime Minister of Guyana (2015–2020)

President – Horacio Cartes, President of Paraguay (2013–2018)

President – Ollanta Humala, President of Peru (2011–2016)
Prime Minister –
Ana Jara, President of the Council of Ministers of Peru (2014–2015)
Pedro Cateriano, President of the Council of Ministers of Peru (2015–2016)

President – Dési Bouterse, President of Suriname (2010–2020)

President –
José Mujica, President of Uruguay (2010–2015)
Tabaré Vázquez, President of Uruguay (2015–2020)

President – Nicolás Maduro, President of Venezuela (2013–present)

Notes

External links
Rulersa list of rulers throughout time and places
WorldStatesmenan online encyclopedia of the leaders of nations and territories

State leaders
State leaders
State leaders
2015